"Bye, Bye" is a song written by Rory Bourke and Phil Vassar and recorded by American country music singer Jo Dee Messina. It was released in January 1998 as the first single from Messina's album I'm Alright, and her first number-one single on both the U.S. and Canadian country charts, spending two weeks at number one on the former.  "Bye, Bye" was certified gold by the RIAA on September 4, 1998, alongside "I'm Alright."

Phil Vassar, who co-wrote the song, included his own rendition on his 2006 album, Greatest Hits, Vol. 1, alternating several lyrics in order to be presented from a masculine perspective in contrast to Messina's feminine point of view. Pop singer Taylor Horn covered it in 2002 for her debut album, taylor-made.

Music video
The music video was directed by Jon Small and premiered in early 1998. It shows Messina driving around in a '67 Pontiac GTO convertible, running away from an unfaithful lover at his house (even at one point literally leaving him in a circle of dust). She is also seen performing the song with her band on a busy city street full of traffic. Her band is dressed in all different vibrant colored clothes. While driving, she constantly tears the rear view mirror off the car. The mirror at one point reflects her street performance of the song. During the bridge, she sings on the hood of the car. It was nominated for the Country Music Association Award for Video of the Year.

Chart performance
"Bye, Bye" debuted at number 59 on the U.S. Billboard Hot Country Singles & Tracks for the week of January 17, 1998.

Year-end charts

Certifications

References

1998 songs
1998 singles
Jo Dee Messina songs
Phil Vassar songs
Taylor Horn songs
Song recordings produced by Byron Gallimore
Song recordings produced by Tim McGraw
Songs written by Phil Vassar
Songs written by Rory Bourke
Curb Records singles